Robertsfors Municipality is a municipality in Västerbotten County in northern Sweden. Its seat is located in Robertsfors.

History
In 1759 the small village Edfastmark became Robertsfors Bruk. It was the Irishman John Jennings and his brother-in-law, the Scotsman Robert Finlay, who founded the new ironworks which also got its name, Robertsfors, from Robert Finlay.

Localities

There are three localities (or urban areas) in Robertsfors Municipality:

The municipal seat in bold

Notable natives
Carl Olof Rosenius, revivalist preacher
Frida Hyvönen, artist
Maud Olofsson, politician
Sahara Hotnights, rock group

References

External links

Robertsfors Municipality – Official site 

Municipalities of Västerbotten County